Burning Gold may refer to:

Burning Gold (1927 film)
Burning Gold (1936 film)
"Burning Gold" (song), a 2014 song by Christina Perri